The 107th Light Anti-Aircraft Regiment, Royal Artillery, (107th LAA Rgt) was an air defence unit of the British Army during World War II. Initially raised as a garrison battalion of the Royal Fusiliers (City of London Regiment) in 1940, which briefly served in the Battle of France, it transferred to the Royal Artillery at the beginning of 1942. It served in Malta and Italy until it was broken to provide infantry reinforcements in 1944.

14th (Overseas Defence) Battalion, Royal Fusiliers

The unit was originally formed on 1 May 1940 at Dover, as 14th (Overseas Defence) Battalion, Royal Fusiliers, as part of the rapid expansion of the British Army with wartime conscripts. The personnel were drawn from No 15 Holding Battalion.

Battle of France
The new battalion was sent to serve as Line of Communication (LoC) troops for the British Expeditionary Force (BEF) that was being assembled in France.

The role of the garrison battalions was to protect the LoCs and airfields under construction. Base security for the LoCs south of the River Somme was the responsibility of Brigadier Archibald Beauman, based at Rouen. When the Germans launched the Battle of France on 10 May they swiftly cut through the Ardennes and swung towards the English Channel, threatening to cut the BEF off from its bases south of the Somme. On 18 May Beauman organised two mobile forces from Territorial Army battalions ('Beauforce') and from infantry reinforcements ('Vicforce'). But Beauforce was unable to cut its way through to reinforce the defenders of Boulogne on 20 May, and Beauman decided to form whatever other troops he had to defend the line of the rivers Andelle and Béthune covering the bases at Dieppe and Rouen.

By 4 June the main BEF had been evacuated from Dunkirk, but the forces south of the Somme were still in place, covering the evacuation of non-fighting services and the landing of fresh British troops for the proposed 'Second BEF' to continue the fight. Beauman Division, as the force had now become, was defending a  gap between Dieppe and the Seine south-east of Rouen. The British government wanted all the improvised forces disbanded and evacuated to the UK, but the local French commander pleaded for them to stay to bolster French morale. The Germans now turned south and on 8 June broke through, forcing the bulk of Beauman division back beyond the Seine. Four days later 51st (Highland) Division and a brigade of Beauman Division were destroyed at Saint-Valery-en-Caux. What remained of Beauman Division and all the other LoC troops were then ordered to fall back to Cherbourg, where they were evacuated on 17 June as part of Operation Ariel.

Island defence
All the troops evacuated from France were immediately engaged in constructing and manning defences in the event of invasion of the UK. Between January and April 1941 14th Royal Fusiliers was engaged in building 27 pillboxes and defended gun positions around the coastline of St Mary's, Isles of Scilly, under the guidance of the Royal Engineers.

Iceland had been occupied by British Forces in 1940, and two companies of 14th Royal Fusiliers were detached in September 1940 and were serving there in early 1941. One of these later became 1st Independent Garrison Company, and two new companies were raised for 14th Royal Fusiliers.

107th Light Anti-Aircraft Regiment

On 1 January 1942 14th Royal Fusiliers transferred to the Royal Artillery (RA) to begin retraining in the light anti-aircraft (LAA) role as 107th Light Anti-Aircraft Regiment, with Regimental Headquarters (RHQ) and 351, 352 and 353 LAA Batteries, each equipped with 18 Bofors 40 mm guns. During initial training, 107th LAA Rgt joined Anti-Aircraft Command in January, but left before it had been assigned to a brigade.

The regiment served in VIII Corps District in South-West England until September, when it came under War Office control preparatory to being deployed overseas. By November 1942 it had the following organisation:
 RHQ
 351, 352, 353 LAA Btys
 351, 352, 353 LAA Workshop Sub-Sections, Royal Electrical and Mechanical Engineers

Malta
On 14 December 1942 the regiment embarked in HM Transport Highland Princess and sailed via Freetown in West Africa to Durban in South Africa, where it spent 18 January–28 February 1943 in a transit camp. It then embarked for Bombay in India arriving on 17 March and re-embarking on 19 March for Basra in Iraq. Having arrived on 1 April it set off once again on 10 April for Suez in Egypt, where it landed on 26 April. At Quassassin Camp it collected vehicles and guns, carried out training, including live firing. 352 LAA Battery left the regiment on 15 May.

The regiment was earmarked for the Allied invasion of Sicily (Operation Husky). On 1 June it began the long overland march from Egypt to Tripoli in Libya, arriving on 14 June. There it embarked on 17 June and disembarked in Malta two days later. 351 LAA Battery was deployed to Ta' Qali airfield and 353 LAA Bty to St. Paul's Bay to provide AA cover for the mass of 'Husky' shipping. At this point the plan was changed and 107th LAA Rgt was replaced in the 'Husky' order of battle by the experienced 74th LAA Rgt, which had served through the Siege of Malta. On 4 July 107th LAA Rgt came under the command of 7th LAA Brigade in the Malta AA defences.

There was little Axis air activity over Malta during the 'Husky' build-up: the assault convoys sailed on 9 July and it was not until 20 July that 20-plus enemy bombers crossed the coast and attacked Grand Harbour and other ports and anchorages. The volume and accuracy of the AA fire they received meant that few bombs reached their intended targets. There were no military casualties or damage to military equipment, but a number of civilian casualties. A second raid on St Paul's Bay in the early hours of 26 July had similar results. After a few lone intruders there were no more air raids, though Malta remained a major base. 107th LAA Rgt now settled into its positions, with 351 LAA Bty at Grand Harbour and 353 LAA Bty at Ta' Qali. The Allies invaded the Italian mainland on 9 September, initiating the long Italian Campaign.

Disbandment
By the summer of 1944 British forces in Italy were suffering an acute manpower shortage. In June  the Chiefs of Staff decided that the number of AA regiments in Italy must be reduced and their fit personnel converted to other roles, particularly infantry.

The defences of Malta were being run down and 107th LAA Regiment went to Italy, where it became one of those selected for disbandment. On 7 July 1944 the regiment was at Afragola Camp near Naples under command of Maj L.M. Rudge, when it was ordered to disband. Of those on the regiment's strength, 17 officers and 268 other ranks (ORs) were sent for infantry training, 12 officers and 193 ORs for posting to other RA units, smaller parties of ORs to the Royal Armoured Corps, Reconnaissance Corps, Royal Engineers and Royal Corps of Signals for retraining. The process was completed on 25 July, when Maj Rudge went to run a Prisoner-of-war camp.

Insignia
107th LAA Regiment adopted a regimental arm badge consisting of a red square with a gold Royal Artillery 'bomb' badge with motto 'UBIQUE' superimposed on a crashing aircraft.

Footnotes

Notes

References

 Basil Collier, History of the Second World War, United Kingdom Military Series: The Defence of the United Kingdom, London: HM Stationery Office, 1957/Uckfield: Naval & Military, 2004 .
 Maj L.F. Ellis, History of the Second World War, United Kingdom Military Series: The War in France and Flanders 1939–1940, London: HM Stationery Office, 1954/Uckfield: Naval & Military, 2004, 978-1-85457-056-6.
 J.B.M. Frederick, Lineage Book of British Land Forces 1660–1978, Vol I, Wakefield: Microform Academic, 1984, .
 J.B.M. Frederick, Lineage Book of British Land Forces 1660–1978, Vol II, Wakefield: Microform Academic, 1984, .
 Lt-Col H.F. Joslen, Orders of Battle, United Kingdom and Colonial Formations and Units in the Second World War, 1939–1945, London: HM Stationery Office, 1960/Uckfield: Naval & Military Press, 2003, .
 Brig C.J.C. Molony, History of the Second World War, United Kingdom Military Series: The Mediterranean and Middle East, Vol VI: Victory in the Mediterranean, Part I: 1st April to 4th June 1944, London: HM Stationery Office, 1987/Uckfield, Naval & Military Press, 2004, .
 Denis Rollo, The Guns and Gunners of Malta, Valetta: Mondial, 1999, .
 Brig N.W. Routledge, History of the Royal Regiment of Artillery: Anti-Aircraft Artillery 1914–55, London: Royal Artillery Institution/Brassey's, 1994, .

External sources
 National Historic List for England at Historic England
 Royal Artillery 1939–45.

Light anti-aircraft regiments of the Royal Artillery
Military units and formations established in 1942
Military units and formations disestablished in 1944